Wilhelminadorp is a village in the Dutch province of Zeeland. It is located in the municipality of Goes.

Wilhelminadorp was founded in 1812, when the Wilhelminapolder was diked. Originally the polder was named Lodewijkspolder, after then King of Holland Louis Bonaparte who had given the permit to start work. With the restoration of the House of Orange, the name was changed in 1815. The polder was now named after Wilhelmina of Prussia, wife of William I of the Netherlands.

Restaurant Katseveer (one Michelin star) is located in the village.

History 
The village was first mentioned in 1849 as "Wilhelminadorp, veelal het Nieuwedorp genoemd". All the land in the polder is owned by De Koninklijke Maatschap de Wilhelminapolder. It is one of the largest landowners of the Netherlands.

Wilhelminadorp was home to 501 people in 1840. In 1841, a church was built by Rijkswaterstaat, but the company paid for the church. It was originally part of the municipality of Kattendijke, however the town hall was located in Wilhelminadorp. In 1970, it was merged into the municipality of Goes.

Gallery

References

Populated places in Zeeland
Populated places established in 1812
Goes
1812 establishments in the Netherlands